Benthoxystus petterdi is a species of sea snail, a marine gastropod mollusc in the family Muricidae, the murex snails or rock snails.

Distribution
This marine species occurs off Tasmania, Australia.

References

 Crosse, H., 1870. Diagnoses molluscorum novorum. Journal de Conchyliologie 18: 301–304
 Fischer-Piette, E., 1950. Liste des types décrits dans le Journal de Conchyliologie et conservés dans la collection de ce journal (avec planches)(suite). Journal de Conchyliologie 90: 149–180

External links
 Crosse, H., 1871. Descriptions d'espèces nouvelles. Journal de Conchyliologie 19: 319–325
 MNHN, Paris: syntype

Gastropods described in 1870
Benthoxystus